Daniel Ngamije served as the Minister of Health in Rwanda. He was appointed in February 2020 by the President of Rwanda and his term ended in November 2022.

Education and career 
Ngamije received a bachelor’s degree in Medicine and Surgery from Universite de Kinhasa and master’s degree in Medicine in Public Health from Universite Libre de Bruxelles, Brusells, Belgium. From 1995 to 1997 Ngamije worked as a Medical Doctor in Kabgayi Hospital. Thereafter, he held other positions in the Ministry of Health and other Rwandan Health sectors in Rwanda. He was the Coordinator of the Project Implementation Unit from 2007 to 2017. Before he was appointed as the Minister of Health in February 2020, he was the Executive for Malaria and Neglected Tropical Diseases under the World Health Organisation.

References 

Living people
21st-century Rwandan politicians
Health ministers of Rwanda
Year of birth missing (living people)